Martha Holmes may refer to:

 Martha Holmes (photographer) (1923–2006), American photographer and photojournalist
 Martha Holmes (broadcaster), British BBC TV journalist, known for her underwater movies